Minamoto no Yoshinaka made his final stand at Awazu, after fleeing from his cousins' armies, which confronted him after he attacked Kyoto, burning the Hōjūjiden, and kidnapping Emperor Go-Shirakawa. During the pursuit he was joined by his foster brother Imai Kanehira and Tomoe Gozen.

During the battle, they fought valiantly, holding off Noriyori's large force of thousands of men for a time. However, in the end, they both died in battle.

Yoshinaka was struck dead by an arrow when his horse became mired in a paddy field.  Kanehira committed suicide by leaping off his horse while holding his sword in his mouth.

Gallery

References 

1180s in Japan
1184 in Asia
Awazu 1184
Awazu
Awasu 1184